The Seven Sisters is an accessory for the 2nd edition of the Advanced Dungeons & Dragons fantasy role-playing game, published in 1995. The Seven Sisters details the fictional characters known as the Seven Sisters of the Forgotten Realms campaign setting.

Contents
The Seven Sisters is a Forgotten Realms accessory that studies the Witch-Queen of Aglarond and her silver-haired siblings, high-level mages who dabble in immortality and troublemaking. The first section contains anecdotes, while the second half focuses on magic (sword and sorcery).

Publication history
The Seven Sisters was written by Ed Greenwood, and published by TSR, Inc. as a 128-page book.

Reception
Rick Swan reviewed The Seven Sisters for Dragon magazine #221 (September 1995). He observes that "Forgotten Realms godfather Ed Greenwood hosts this study" of the Seven Sisters. He notes that the first section is "rich in anecdotes [and] reads like excerpts from a good fantasy novel". Swan concludes by stating: "At 128 pages, the book may strike some as overkill. But if you make it to the end, you'll probably know more about the Sisters than you know about your own relatives."

References

Forgotten Realms sourcebooks
Role-playing game supplements introduced in 1995